Gemelli is Italian for twins. It may also refer to:
 Agostino Gemelli (1878–1959), Italian psychologist
 Giovanni Francesco Gemelli Careri (1651–1725), Italian traveler, adventurer and jurist 
 Agostino Gemelli University Polyclinic, a teaching hospital in Rome
 Gemelli (pasta), a kind of pasta in the shape of twisted-paired spiral tubes
 Gemelli, a collective reference to the superior gemellus muscle and inferior gemellus muscle (muscles of the pelvis)